Stephen Watford (fl. 1384–1388), of Wycombe, Buckinghamshire, was an English politician.

He was a Member (MP) of the Parliament of England for Wycombe in April 1384, 1385 and September 1388.

References

Year of birth missing
Year of death missing
English MPs April 1384
People from Buckinghamshire
English MPs 1385
English MPs September 1388